Horst Robert Rittner (16 July 1930 – 14 June 2021) was a German correspondence chess Grandmaster. He was born in Breslau, Weimar Germany, and was the sixth ICCF World Champion, between 1968 and 1971. He also edited the German magazine Schach.

References

External links
 
 
 Nachruf bei ChessBase von André Schulz, Obituary – 18 June 2021
 Nachricht beim Deutschen Schachbund, News – 19 June 2021
 

1930 births
2021 deaths
German chess players
Correspondence chess grandmasters
World Correspondence Chess Champions
Sportspeople from Wrocław
People from the Province of Lower Silesia